Arcwelder is an American punk rock band from Minneapolis, Minnesota, formed in 1987. The band, a perennial local favorite, consists of brothers Rob and Bill Graber and Scott Macdonald, all of whom share in songwriting and singing.

History 
Under their original name Tilt-A-Whirl, the band released their first album, This, in 1990 on the small Minneapolis label Big Money, Inc. As the record was being released, the band was sued for trademark infringement by Sellner Manufacturing, the manufacturer of the Tilt-A-Whirl amusement ride. Rather than go to court, the band changed their name to Arcwelder, the title of an instrumental on the record. The initial release of This had a disclaimer sticker noting the lack of affiliation between the ride's manufacturer and the band.

Arcwelder has toured the U.S., with such bands as the Jesus Lizard, Jawbox, and Tar, and has played shows with such artists as Dirty Three, Pegboy, Caspar Brötzmann, and Cows.

In 1992, the song "Favor", from the album Jacket Made in Canada, appeared at number 32 on John Peel's "Festive Fifty".

In both 2002 and 2012, Arcwelder was invited to perform in the UK All Tomorrow's Parties music festival, by those years' curators Shellac. The names of all three members of Arcwelder appear on the cover of the 1997 Shellac album, The Futurist.

The band has been honored with a star on the outside mural of the Minneapolis nightclub First Avenue, recognizing performers that have played sold-out shows or have otherwise demonstrated a major contribution to the culture at the iconic venue. Receiving a star "might be the most prestigious public honor an artist can receive in Minneapolis," according to journalist Steve Marsh.

All of the original members of the band reformed for a performance at the Touch and Go 25th anniversary celebration held September 8–10, 2006 in Chicago, Illinois.

The band has not released any new music since 1999 but still continues to tour as of 2022.

Arcwelder is no relation to the Australian band "The Arcwelders". The Arcwelders performed regularly at various venues in Melbourne between 1989 and 1994. They were best known for the chart topping teen anthem "This Place".

Discography

Albums
 This (1990)
 Jacket Made In Canada (1991)
 Pull (1993)
 Xerxes (1994)
 Entropy (1996)
 Everest (1999)

7" Singles
 "Pint Of Blood" b/w "Define My Life" (Sonic Boom Records, 1988)
 "Favor" b/w "Plastic" (Douphonic/ Big Money Inc, 1992)
 "I Am The Walrus" b/w "Sign Of The Times" (Big Money Inc, 1992)
 "Raleigh" b/w "Rosa, Walls" (Touch and Go, 1992)
 "Captain Allen" b/w "White Elephant" (Touch and Go, 1995)

References

External links 
 
 
Touch and Go Records 25th Anniversary footage of Arcwelder performance and interview

Indie rock musical groups from Minnesota
Musical groups established in 1988
Touch and Go Records artists